The Kla-Mo-Ya Casino is a tribal-owned gambling establishment located in Klamath County, Oregon. Its name is derived from the name of the Klamath, Modoc, and Yahooskin tribes.

In 2010, the casino completed construction of a truck stop aimed at utilizing the north–south trucking traffic along U.S. Route 97. It includes two covered fueling stations and a small food mart. The truck stop was largely built with Klamath Tribal labor from the nearby town of Chiloquin, Oregon.

See also
Gambling in Oregon

References

External links
 Kla-Mo-Ya Casino (official website)

Buildings and structures in Klamath County, Oregon
Casinos in Oregon
Modoc tribe
Klamath
Native American casinos
Tourist attractions in Klamath County, Oregon
2005 establishments in Oregon
Casinos completed in 2005
Native American history of Oregon